Yongchang Real Estate Group Co., Ltd. also known as Ever Bright Group, is a Chinese real estate company registered in Shijiazhuang, Hebei Province. The Chinese name of the company was formerly known literally as Heibei Yongchang Real Estate Development Co., Ltd..

Yongchang also has a sister company in Melbourne, Australia, known as Ever Bright Group Pty Ltd. (trading name EBG Developments), which was held by Wang Ziman (90%) and Yuan Wanyong (10%). They were also the shareholder of Yongchang Real Estate Group for 80% and 10% stake respectively. Another shareholder of Yongchang Real Estate Group was Yuan Wanheng for 10% stake.

Football
The group is the major shareholder of Shijiazhuang Ever Bright F.C. In January 2019, the group acquired the remaining 50% stake from other investors.

Tourism
Yongchang is one of the investors of a joint venture,  in Hengshui.

References

External links
 
 Official website of EBG Developments

Real estate companies of China
Privately held companies of China
Companies based in Hebei